Humayon Dar is the director general of the Cambridge Institute of Islamic Finance, a research institute specializing in the financial sectors of the countries with significant proportion of Islamic banking and finance.

Prior to joining Cambridge IIF, Dar served as Director General of Islamic Research & Training Institute (IRTI) of Islamic Development Bank (IsDB). He is also Chairman of the Cambridge-Edbiz Group of Companies, which owns Edbiz Consulting and Cambridge IFA. He is a sharia (Islamic law) advisor, Islamic economist, and advocate for Islamic banking and finance. He has served as a member of the Shari'a boards of Arabesque Asset Management, Abu Dhabi Commercial Bank, Omarco Holding, Hong Leong Islamic Bank Malaysia, Hong Leong MSIG Takaful, Allianz Global Investors Luxembourg, and UMEX Securities. He served as managing director at Deutsche Bank and CEO of its Islamic finance subsidiary, and has also been a visiting Professor for Islamic Finance for universities in the UK, Malaysia and the Middle East.

Though not a classically trained Islamic scholar, he has undergone training in the Islamic sciences, such as Quranic hermaneutics. His academic influences include Muhammad Umer Chapra, Khurshid Ahmad, Anas Zarka, Nejatullah Siddiqi and Abdul Rahman Yousri.

Education and personal life
Dar was born in Gakkhar Mandi on the Pakistani side of the Punjab province. After he finished secondary school education at his home town, the young Dar was sent to Lahore, where he attended Government College Lahore (now called University Government College Lahore). He spent two years there before he was admitted to International Islamic University Islamabad in 1986.

Dar holds a Bachelor of Science (Hons) and Master of Science (both in Islamic Economics) from the International Islamic University Islamabad (IIU), as well as an MPhil and PhD (both in Economics) from Cambridge University.

Professional life
Dar co-founded (with Joohn Presley) an MSc program in Islamic economics, banking & finance at Loughborough University. He has also assisted the Cass Business School, of London's City University, in creating and offering an Executive MBA in Islamic Finance. He holds a Visiting Professor position in Islamic Finance at Universiti Teknologi Mara (UiTM), and is an Adjunct Professor in Islamic Finance at COMSATS Institute of Information Technology Lahore (Pakistan).

In 2005, he joined Dar Al Istithmar, a joint venture between Deutsche Bank, the Oxford Center for Islamic Studies and Russell Wood, which was created to provide advice on offering financial products that comply with Islamic law. Deutsche Bank organised a series of seminars regarding Islamic finance throughout the Middle East in 2005, with which Humayon Dar emerged as an influential opinion-maker in the global Islamic financial services industry. In March 2006, Dar was named managing director of Dar Al Istithmar and a managing director at Deutsche Bank. Under Dar's leadership, Dar Al Istithmar emerged as a global think tank for Islamic finance. His leadership was recognised by Euromoney that presented Dar Al Istithmar "Best Islamic Advisory & Assurance" award, for both 2006 and 2007.

In 2007, the team from Dar Al Istithmar was absorbed by the BMB Group, the Eastern-focused investment and advisory group led by Rayo Withanage, the resulting company renamed BMB Islamic. Dar was appointed as its CEO. In 2008, BMB Islamic was accepted as member of the Bahrain-based association Accounting and Auditing Organisation for Islamic Financial Institutions. In March 2011, he founded Edbiz Consulting Limited, which fast emerged as a leading think tank for the Islamic financial services industry. In September 2012, Dar successfully launched Edbiz Corporation as a holding company for all the businesses he has developed over the years. Dar serves as its chairman. Following the success of his various ventures, in 2014 he founded Cambridge IFA, a company specialising in Islamic financial innovation.

In addition to his advocacy of Islamic banking and finance, Dar sits on a number of Sharia Advisory Boards. He has previously sat on Sharia Boards of Allianz Global Investors (Luxembourg), Hong Leong Islamic Bank (Malaysia), Hong Leong Tokio Takaful Marine (Malaysia) and Halal Industries Group (UK). Through his Shari'a advisory role with Nasdaq OMX, he was instrumental in developing Nasdaq 100 Sharia and OMX 30 Sharia indices of which 7 are already in the market. His current Sharia advisory engagements include Arabesque Asset Management, Omarco, and Nasdaq OMX.

Dar co-edited a book on "Sharia and Legal Aspects of Islamic Finance".  Dar is also founding editor of Global Islamic Finance Report, an annual publication reporting on developments in the Islamic financial services industry worldwide. Global Islamic Finance Report 2012, released in March 2012, focuses on Islamic philanthropy and social responsibility and was recognised at Global Donor Forum 2012 as the best research publication on the topic. The then Crown Prince of the State of Perak (Malaysia) and now Sultan of Perak, Nazrin Shah, presented the Best Research & Publication in Islamic Philanthropy Award to Professor Humayon Dar on 28 April 2012, at the Global Donor Forum held in Kuala Lumpur. GIFR has since then become an influential yearbook in Islamic banking and finance.

In 2009, he also founded Islamic Finance Access Programme (IFAP), which aims at providing affordable Islamic financial intelligence to the institutions and individuals seeking to learn more about the Islamic financial services industry. In 2011, Dar's consultancy firm, Edbiz Consulting, started a new quarterly magazine, ISFIRE (Islamic Finance Review), which specialises in analyses of new trends in Islamic banking and finance. In 2011, Dar also founded Global Islamic Finance Awards (GIFA). The first awards ceremony took place in December 2011 at Muscat (Oman), where H.E. Tun Abdullah Bin Haji Ahmad Badawi, former Prime Minister of Malaysia, received the top "Global Islamic Finance Leadership Award." The second awards ceremony took place on 19 November 2012 at Kuala Lumpur (Malaysia), where HRH Raja Dr. Nazrin Shah, the Regent of the State of Perak, received the top "Global Islamic Finance Leadership Award." The third ceremony took place in Dubai on 26 November 2013, where HE Shaukat Aziz, a former prime minister of Pakistan received Global Islamic Finance Leadership Award for 2013. The fourth GIFA ceremony took place in Dubai on 26–27 October 2014, where HE Nursultan Nazabayev, president of Kazakhstan became the fourth GIFA Laureate when he received "Global Islamic Finance Leadership Award", witnessed by Sheikh Moahmed Bin Rashid Al Maktoum, the ruler of Dubai and vice-president and prime minister of UAE. The fifth GIFA ceremony took place in Bahrain on 28 October 2015, were HRH Emir Muhammadu Sanusi II (current Emir of Kano) received the prestigious Global Islamic Finance Leadership Award and was proclaimed the fifth GIFA Laureate.

Works
Sharia and Legal Aspects of Islamic Finance 2009. co-edited with Umar Moghul, (Chancellor Publications, London (UK))

References

External links
BMB Islamic
Interview with Dr Humayon Dar
RedMoney Group

1970 births
Living people
Academics of Loughborough University
Pakistani economists
International Islamic University, Islamabad alumni
Government College University, Lahore alumni
People associated with Bayes Business School
Pakistani emigrants to the United Kingdom
Naturalised citizens of the United Kingdom